Coaxana is a genus of flowering plant in the family Apiaceae, native to Mexico, Guatemala and Honduras. It has two species.

References 

Apioideae
Apioideae genera